Shahriyar Moghanlou (born 21 December 1994) is an Iranian professional footballer who plays as a centre-forward for Persian Gulf Pro League club Sepahan.

Club career
Moghanlou started his professional career with Paykan while he promoted to the first team in the winter of 2015. He made his professional debut for Paykan against Gostaresh Foulad on 4 February 2015 while he used as a substitute for Ali Hosseini.

Santa Clara
On 23 September 2020, Moghanlou signed a three-year contract with Portuguese Primeira Liga side Santa Clara.

Persepolis
On 7 March 2021, Moghanlou signed a contract with Persian Gulf Pro League champions Persepolis. The details of the fee contract have not been released.

Career statistics

Club

Honours

Club 
Paykan
Azadegan League (1): 2015–16

Persepolis
Persian Gulf Pro League (1): 2020–21
Iranian Super Cup (1): 2020

Individual
Azadegan League Top Goalscore (1): 2018–19

References

External links
 Shahriyar Moghanlou at IranLeague.ir
 Shahriyar Moghanlou at PersianLeague.com

1994 births
Living people
People from Zanjan, Iran
Iranian footballers
Association football forwards
Paykan F.C. players
Malavan players
C.D. Santa Clara players
Persepolis F.C. players
Sepahan S.C. footballers
Persian Gulf Pro League players
Azadegan League players
Primeira Liga players
Iranian expatriate footballers
Expatriate footballers in Portugal
Iranian expatriate sportspeople in Portugal